Batu Anam is a town in the northern part of Segamat District, Johor, Malaysia. It is about halfway between downtown Segamat and Gemas, Negeri Sembilan.

Economy
Batu Anam is surrounded by rubber and oil palm plantations and the more prominent plantations are Sungei Senarut Estate, Paya Lang Estate and Gomali Estate with a number of smaller estates and smallholdings. There is an old rubber factory known as H&C Latex still in use. Paya Lang Club had a beautiful 9-hole Golf Course which is now planted with Palm Oil trees after the plantation was sold to local interests.

Education
Batu Anam offers both lower and higher level education center. It host Sekolah Kebangsaan Batu Anam, SRJK (C) Hwa Nan and SRJK (T) Batu Anam for primary school. For secondary school, the town has SMK Batu Anam and SMK Sri Kenangan, a smart school located 2 km from Batu Anam town. For higher education center, Batu Anam is a host of Kolej Komuniti Segamat II and Universiti Teknologi MARA (UiTM) Johor.

Transportation
The town is served by Batu Anam Railway Station of Keretapi Tanah Melayu. The station is currently mothballed; passengers are advised to access Segamat station instead.

References

Towns in Johor
Segamat District